Gary Smith (birth registered first quarter 1951) is an English former professional rugby league footballer who played in the 1970s and 1980s.

Background
Gary Smith's birth was registered in York, Yorkshire, England.

Playing career

York
Gary Smith made his début for York on Monday 3 April 1972, he was a member of the sides that won promotion from the Second Division to the First Division as champions during the 1980–81 season, and in third-place during the 1984–85 season, during his time at York he scored 94 three-point tries and 13 four-point tries, and he played his last match for York on Thursday 12 December 1985.

Smith played , and scored a try, in York's 8–18 defeat by Bradford Northern in the 1978–79 Yorkshire Cup Final during the 1978–79 season at Headingley, Leeds on Saturday 28 October 1978, in front of a crowd of 10,429.

Gary Smith played in York's 2–29 defeat by Australia at Clarence Street, York on Tuesday 14 November 1978, under temporary floodlights.

Gary Smith played in York's 8–14 defeat by Wigan in the 1983–84 Challenge Cup semi-final during the 1983–84 season at Elland Road, Leeds on Saturday 24 March 1984, in front of a crowd of 17,156.

Sheffield Eagles
Smith signed for Sheffield Eagles in January 1986.

Batley
Smith signed for Batley in November 1988.

Representative honours
Gary Smith won cap(s) for Yorkshire while at York.

Honoured at York
Gary Smith is an inductee into both the York Hall Of Fame and the York Legends Roster.

Genealogical information
Gary Smith is the father of the rugby league footballer; Chris Smith.

References

External links
Search for "Gary Smith" at britishnewspaperarchive.co.uk

1950s births
Living people
English rugby league players
Rugby league utility players
Rugby league players from York
Year of birth missing (living people)
York Wasps players
Sheffield Eagles (1984) players
Batley Bulldogs players
Yorkshire rugby league team players